The 20th hijacker is a possible additional terrorist in the September 11 attacks of 2001 who, for unknown reasons, was unable to participate. The 20th hijacker, though not present during the actual attacks, is said to have been deeply involved in the preparations. There were many variations of the 9/11 plot, with the number of terrorists fluctuating with available resources and changing circumstances. In the end, there were 19 hijackers: three of the planes were taken over by five members each and the fourth was hijacked by four people. The latter plane, United Airlines Flight 93, crashed into a field near Shanksville, Pennsylvania, due to the resistance from passengers before it could reach its target in Washington, D.C.

Hijackers
Ramzi bin al-Shibh allegedly meant to take part in the attacks and may have been the intended hijacker-pilot of American Airlines Flight 77, but he was repeatedly denied a visa for entry into the US. His role as one of the four hijacker-pilots preceded Hani Hanjour.

Mohammed al-Qahtani, a Saudi Arabian citizen, is often referred to as the 20th hijacker. José Meléndez-Pérez, a U.S. Immigration inspector at Orlando International Airport, refused his entry into the U.S. in August 2001. He was later captured in Afghanistan and imprisoned at the U.S. military prison known as Camp X-Ray at Guantanamo Bay, Cuba.  In January 2009, Susan J. Crawford asserted that Qahtani's interrogation at Camp X-Ray amounted to torture.

Zacarias Moussaoui, a French citizen of Moroccan origin, has widely been referred to as the 20th hijacker. Moussaoui may have been considered as a replacement for Ziad Jarrah, who at one point threatened to withdraw from the scheme because of tensions amongst the plotters. Plans to include Moussaoui were never finalized, as the al-Qaeda hierarchy had doubts about his reliability. Ultimately, Moussaoui did not play a role in the hijacking scheme. He was arrested about four weeks before the attacks.  Moussaoui is now serving a life sentence for his involvement in the 9/11 attacks. He pleaded guilty in 2005 to collaborating with the other hijackers. Moussaoui claimed he and Richard Reid unsuccessfully attempted to hijack a plane on 9/11.

According to the BBC, Fawaz al-Nashimi claimed to have been the "20th hijacker".   An al-Qaeda video has been released from a US intelligence organization, showing al-Nashimi justifying attacks on the west. The U.S dismissed al-Nashimi's claims as propaganda. He was also known as Turki bin Fuheid al-Muteiry and took part in a May 29, 2004, attack on oil facilities in Khobar, Saudi Arabia. He was killed in a June 2004 shootout with Saudi Arabian security forces.

The other al-Qaeda members who allegedly attempted, but were not able, to take part in the attacks were Saeed al-Ghamdi (not to be confused with the successful hijacker of the same name), Tawfiq bin Attash, Ali Abdul Aziz Ali, Mushabib al-Hamlan, Abderraouf Jdey, Zakariya Essabar, Saeed Ahmad al-Zahrani, Ali Abd al-Rahman al-Faqasi al-Ghamdi, Saeed al-Baluchi, Qutaybah al-Najdi, Zuhair al-Thubaiti, and Saud al-Rashi. Khalid Sheikh Mohammed, the attack's alleged mastermind, had wanted to remove at least one member – Khalid al-Mihdhar – from the operation, but he was overruled by Osama bin Laden.

In popular culture
The Saudi Arabian novelist Abdullah Thabit wrote a 2006 novel titled Terrorist Number 20 that became a bestseller. The book recalls his teenage years as a religious extremist and was inspired in part by Ahmed al-Nami, one of the 9/11 hijackers and a fellow resident of Abha who was vaguely familiar to Thabit. In April 2006, three months after the release of the book, Thabit was forced to move from Abha to Jeddah with his family after receiving death threats.

See also 
 USS Cole bombing mastermind  Multiple individuals were alleged to be the mastermind of the USS Cole bombing.

References

September 11 attacks